All of the 50 constituent states of the United States and several of its territories and the District of Columbia issued individual passenger license plates for the year 1989.

Passenger baseplates

Non-passenger plates

See also

Antique vehicle registration
Electronic license plate
Motor vehicle registration
Vehicle license

References

External links

1989 in the United States
1989